This is a list of Wakefield Trinity players. Wakefield Trinity are an English rugby league club. As of 31 November 2016, the club has had 1,377 players. Prior to 1895 the club played rugby union and these players are listed separately.

Post-1895 rugby league players
Statistics correct as of 30 September 2016

^¹ = Played For Wakefield Trinity (Wildcats) During More Than One Period
^² = Prior to the 1974–75 season all goals, whether; conversions, penalties, or drop-goals, scored two points, consequently prior to this date drop-goals were often not explicitly documented, and "0 ^²" indicates that drop-goals may not have been recorded, rather than no drop-goals scored. In addition, prior to the 1949–50 season, the archaic Field-goal was also still a valid means of scoring points. 
BBC = BBC2 Floodlit Trophy
CC = Challenge Cup
CF = Championship Final
CM = Captain Morgan Trophy
RT = League Cup, i.e. Player's No. 6, John Player (Special), Regal Trophy
YC = Yorkshire County Cup
YL = Yorkshire League

'A' team (reserve grade) rugby league players disabled/killed in World War I

Pre-1895 rugby union players (incomplete)

References

Sources
 
 
 
 

Wakefield Trinity